DEQX (Digital Equalization and Crossover) is an Australian-based company that develops digital loudspeaker and room correction technology.

DEQX processors correct loudspeaker distortion and also apply room compensation as required. DEQX equipment is used by Jeff Rowland Design Group in the USA and Abbey Road Mastering Studios in the UK.

References

Loudspeaker manufacturers
Audio equipment manufacturers of Australia